Minsi Trails Council is a council of the Boy Scouts of America that serves Scouts of eastern Pennsylvania's Lehigh Valley and Pocono regions as well as parts of western New Jersey. The council serves five counties in Pennsylvania: Lehigh, Northampton, Monroe, Carbon, Luzerne, and Warren county in New Jersey.

Minsi Trails Council serves nearly 10,000 youth through the leadership of 5,000 adult volunteers.

The council was formed in 1969, after the merger of the Bethlehem Area Council, Delaware Valley Area Council, and Lehigh Council. The council consists of six districts and maintains two camping properties: Camp Minsi in Pocono Summit, Pennsylvania, and Trexler Scout Reservation in Jonas, Pennsylvania. Combined, these camps serve more than 4,000 campers annually.

Organization
The Minsi Trails Council maintains a central headquarters and service center in Allentown, Pennsylvania. The service center includes offices, conference rooms, and a council Scout shop. A copy of the R. Tait McKenzie sculpture The Ideal Scout stands outside the center.

The council is divided into six districts divided by county and school district boundaries based on geographic location and size. A seventh Urban Scouting District runs the national Scoutreach program.

 Anthracite District — Serving portions of Luzerne County, Pennsylvania (including White Haven, Weatherly, Freeland, Beaver Meadows, Hazleton, McAdoo, West Hazleton, Conyngham, Drums, and Sugarloaf.) 
 Forks of Delaware District — Serving portions of Northampton County, Pennsylvania (Bangor Area School District, Easton Area School District, Nazareth Area School District, Pen Argyl Area School District, and Wilson School District) and Warren County, NJ (Phillipsburg School District, Belvidere School District, and Hackettstown School District)
 North Valley District — Serving portions of Lehigh County, Pennsylvania and Carbon County, Pennsylvania (including Parkland School District, Whitehall-Coplay School District, Northampton Area School District, Northwestern Lehigh School District, Lehighton Area School District, Palmerton Area School District, Jim Thorpe Area School District, Catasauqua Area School District, and Northern Lehigh School District)
 Pocono District — Serving Monroe County, Pennsylvania (including Stroudsburg Area School District, East Stroudsburg Area School District, Pleasant Valley School District, and Pocono Mountain School District)
 South Mountain District — Serving portions of Northampton County, Pennsylvania and Lehigh County, Pennsylvania (including Bethlehem Area School District and Saucon Valley School District)
 Trexler District — Serving portions of Lehigh County, Pennsylvania (including Allentown School District, Salisbury Township School District, and East Penn School District)

Camps
Minsi Trails Council owns and maintains three camps. The first of which opened in 1928, Trexler Scout Reservation. Currently, Akelaland (Cub Scout) camp and Settlers Camp (Scouts BSA camp) share this 900+acre (3.6 km2) Scout Reservation in Jonas, Pennsylvania. Also a part of the Minsi Trails Council is Camp Minsi, a Scouts BSA camp, over 1,200 acres (5 km2) in Pocono Summit, Pennsylvania.

Trexler Scout Reservation

Trexler Scout Reservation is located on 900 acres of land in Jonas, Pennsylvania. This tract of land was parceled together and donated by noted WW1 General and Lehigh Valley philanthropist Harry C. Trexler with Scouts first enjoying the property in 1926, and in 1928 the camp held its first official BSA summer camp program.

In 2022, the council announced it would sell the property in order to raise needed funds.

Akelaland
Akelaland is a Cub Scout resident camp located within Trexler Scout Reservation. In the mid-1980s, the camp was converted to a Cub Scout resident camp. The Pioneer building, a small, one-room building with a wood-burning stove, still stands today, as well as other parts of the original camp.

Akelaland has a swimming pool, shooting ranges (for archery and BB guns), an 18-hole miniature golf course, health lodge, trading post, dining hall, parade field, shower houses, and an activities field. The camp also has a waterfront for boating and fishing at Lake Trexler.

Akelaland offers a week-long resident camp program during the summer which includes swimming, boating, nature, archery, BB Gun, handicraft, athletics, outdoor skills, water games, fishing, hiking, astronomy, flag ceremonies, singing, scavenger hunts and special theme related events. "Mini Weeks" are also available for Scouts running from Sunday to Wednesday each week.  Webelos II's can participate in a week-long program called Pioneer Camp, which includes a four-mile wilderness hike and outpost.

Settlers Camp
Settlers Camp - Trexler Scout Reservation is the Scouts BSA resident Camp portion of the Reservation. With three separate ranges, a rifle, a shotgun, and an archery range, a Disk Golf Course, a massive Gaga Ball Pit, eight program areas filled with activities, a developed Aquatics program at its Waterfront on Lake Trexler, and a fully featured C.O.P.E./High Adventure Action Center Area.

Today, premier attributes include two lakes, a pool, a new fully equipped Campfire Circle, one of Northeast Pennsylvania's Largest COPE Courses, varied Merit Badge offerings, an unrivaled Scouting Program, a Leader Outdoor Skills and Scoutmaster Specifics Training Program area titled "L.O.S.T", a Music and Arts program, a Stem Program in SENTR area, a trade skills merit badge program named "This Old Camp", age-specific tailored programs for First Year Campers (Operation First Class), and more seasoned Scouters (an Older Scout Program), as well as over 25 miles of hiking, orienteering and mountain biking trails to explore.

Camp Minsi

Camp Minsi is on the shores of the  Stillwater Lake in Pocono Summit, Pennsylvania. The camp was donated to the Boy Scouts in 1949 by Samuel Rubel of the Pocono Mountain Ice Company. The camp was formerly owned by Bethlehem Area Council prior to the establishment of Minsi Trails Council in 1969. 

A central feature of the camp is Stillwater Lake. The lake provides opportunities for swimming, small-boat sailing, canoeing, rowing, kayaking, fishing, standup paddleboarding, boardsailing, blobbing and other aquatic activities. Camp Minsi's first-year camper program is known as the Trail to Adventure (TTA). The camp's ScoutCraft area teaches outdoor skills - while the unique Minsi Village and Voyageur Outpost areas provide hands-on living history with focuses on primitive outdoor skills, blacksmithing, woodsmithing, lumberjacking, Native American culture, archaeology, pioneering, branding, games, crafts, and cooking. The camp's Handicraft area allows Scouts to experience the crafts of woodcarving, leather crafting, basketry, pottery, art, textiles and model building. The camp's Ecology-Conservation area offers environmental programs and nature studies. The Shooting Sports area allows Scouts to shoot rifles, shotguns, and bows and arrows. Other program areas include programs focused on citizenship and communications, health and safety, trade skills, sports and athletics, and adult leadership training.

In addition to its traditional Scouts BSA program areas, Camp Minsi offers high adventure programs for Venturers and older Scouts. High adventure offerings include whitewater rafting, mountain biking, horseback riding, treetop adventures and zip-lining, and other activities both on, and off, site.

Camp Minsi has over 20 buildings, 11 established troop sites, 10 primitive outpost sites, four freshwater springs, miles of trails and several historical and natural points of interest.

The camp has been named "Best Campground", "Best Non-Profit", "Best Fishing Trip", "Best River Rafting / River Trip", and "Best Kayaks" in the Poconos by the readers of the Pocono Record in the newspaper's 2013, 2014, 2015, and 2017 "Reader's Choice" contests. The camp was featured in Scouting and Men's Health magazines in 2015.

Specialty camps
 Pocono Summit Adventure Camp — Established in 2018, the Pocono Summit Adventure Camp is a high adventures specialty camp geared towards Venturing crews and older Scouts. Based out of Camp Minsi, the program includes whitewater rafting on the Lehigh River, mountain biking the Lehigh Gorge, treetop adventure climbing and zip-lines, horseback riding, and other special activities highlighting the unique features of the Pocono mountains.

 Minsi Trails STEM Camp — Established in 2017 under the name SkillsFest, this program is a specialty week focused on STEM education. During the week participants work with field experts and professionals to earn skill-specific merit badges and other Scouts BSA awards.

 The National Muslim Scout Jamboree — Established in 2016, Camp Minsi hosts this biennial event in collaboration with the National Islamic Committee on Scouting (NICS) and the Boy Scouts of America (BSA). Focusing on the Messengers of Peace initiative, the jamboree welcomes members of the Islamic Scouting community from across the country and around the globe. The 2016 Jamboree was attended by Charles W. Dahlquist II, the National Commissioner .

 Pocono Summit Day Camp — The camp hosts an annual week-long Cub Scout day camp each August. The camp has been named "Best Day Camp" in the Poconos by the readers of the Pocono Record in the newspaper's 2013, 2014, 2015, and 2017 "Reader's Choice" contests.

 Winter IceFest — Established in 2017, the Winter IceFest on Stillwater Lake is an annual winter festival for Scouts hosted at Camp Minsi. Activities include ice fishing and ice cutting demonstrations, plus snow and ice games and Scouting demonstrations and displays.

Gallery

Order of the Arrow

Minsi Trails Council is home to the Witauchsoman Lodge of the Order of the Arrow. Witauchsoman means "to be in fellowship with somebody".

In 1928, thirteen years after the introduction of the Order of the Arrow into Scouting, Minsi Lodge #5 emerged. The Minsi Lodge served the Lehigh Council that operated Trexler Scout Reservation at the time. In 1936, the Pohopoco Lodge #44 replaced the Minsi Lodge. For thirty-three years the Pohopoco Lodge acted as a pilot lodge, helping to start new lodges in the area. The other lodges were the Tunkhannock Lodge #476 of the Bethlehem Area Council operating Camp Minsi, and the Ah'Pace Lodge #58 of the Delaware Valley Area Council operating Camp Weygadt. The tri-merger of the councils and their lodges resulted in Witauchsoman Lodge #44. The totem of the lodge is three peace pipes (symbolizing the three predecessor lodges) strong on a bow. In 1980, a new chapter that formerly served the Anthracite Scouting Organization joined the lodge. This was a result of the organization becoming a new district in the Minsi Trails Council. In 1994, Witauchsoman re-established chapters. Each of the council's six Scouting districts operates a chapter.

Chapters
 Ah'Pace Chapter (Forks of the Delaware District)
 Quekolis Chapter (Anthracite District)
 Pohopoco Chapter (Trexler District)
 Tunkhannock Chapter (South Mountain District)
 Pokawachne Chapter (Pocono District)
 Wapagokhos Chapter (North Valley District)

See also
 Scouting in Pennsylvania

Further reading

References

External links
 

Lehigh Valley
Local councils of the Boy Scouts of America
Youth organizations based in Pennsylvania
Youth organizations based in New Jersey
1969 establishments in Pennsylvania
Northeast Region (Boy Scouts of America)